Knipowitschia thessala, the Thessaly goby, is a species of goby endemic to the Pineios River system in Thessaly, Greece. This species can reach a length of  TL.

References

Fish described in 1921
Endemic fauna of Greece
Freshwater fish of Europe
thessala
Thessaly
Taxonomy articles created by Polbot